Ambigai Neril Vanthaal is a 1984 Indian Tamil-language film directed by Manivannan, starring Mohan, Radha and Urvashi. It was released on 8 December 1984.

Plot

Cast 
Mohan
Radha
Urvashi
Sangeeta
Ambika (cameo)
Vanitha
Y. G. Mahendra
Janagaraj
Senthil
V. K. Ramasamy

Soundtrack 
The soundtrack was composed by Ilaiyaraaja.

References

External links 
 

1980s Tamil-language films
1984 drama films
1984 films
Films directed by Manivannan
Films scored by Ilaiyaraaja
Indian drama films